City Developments Limited (CDL), sometimes also known as CityDev, is a Singaporean multinational real estate operating organisation. Founded in 1963, CDL first developed projects in Johor Bahru, Malaysia, as well as in Singapore. Due to geo-political changes, CDL was making a loss before being controlled by Hong Leong Bank via shares acquisition in 1969. Since then, CDL has developed many types of properties from shopping malls to integrated developments. CDL is currently headquartered in Republic Plaza, Singapore. Kwek Leng Beng is its current chairman and Sherman Kwek, Kwek Leng Beng's son, is its current chief executive officer.

History 
City Developments Limited was founded on 7 September 1963 as a property company, initially starting with eight employees in Amber Mansions on Orchard Road. The company subsequently listed on the Malayan Stock Exchange (present-day Singapore Exchange) in November of the same year.

When the company first started, it built its first project in Johor Bahru, Malaysia; a 200-unit bungalow development called Fresh Breezes, which was completed in 1965. With Fresh Breezes, CDL introduced the concept of a "show house" as a sales technique, which was "believed to be unique in Asia". It allows prospective buyers to preview how a property looks like before buying the property. It built its second project in Johor Bahru called Marine Vista, a project that has expansive views of the Straits of Johor. CDL built its first Singapore project called City Towers in Bukit Timah, which was completed in 1966. This was said to be Singapore's first high-rise project. It also built Singapore's first condominium concept project, Clementi Park, in the same year.

CDL was unprofitable for its first seven years' of operations, with the race riots in 1969 and withdrawal of British troops from Singapore affecting the property markets in Malaysia and Singapore. Thus, CDL was forced to sell its properties in Johor Bahru and consolidated itself into the Singapore market. Hong Leong Group began to invest in CDL in 1969, buying a substantial stake which allowed them to place three directors on CDL's board. In 1972, Kwek Leng Beng, then an executive in Hong Leong Group, led an acquisition of a controlling stake in CDL, transforming CDL into the core publicly traded entity of Hong Leong Group. Kwek Leng Beng later became the managing director of CDL in 1974, and the executive chairman in 1995 after the death of his father, Kwek Hong Png. Kwek Leng Joo, the younger brother of Kwek Leng Beng, became the managing director. Its flagship building, Republic Plaza, was officially opened on 18 January 1998 by then Prime Minister of Singapore Goh Chok Tong.

With Hong Leong Group's investments into CDL, CDL's industrial properties was offloaded into Hong Leong Holdings, a subsidiary of Hong Leong Group. It then diversified into hospitality industry through the establishment of CDL Hotels International (CDLHI) in 1989. CDLHI acquired hotel properties across Asia, Europe, and United States. Leveraging on the Millennium and Copthorne brands, CDL listed Millennium & Copthorne Hotels (M&C) on London Stock Exchange (LSE) in 1996. More hotel properties and brands were acquired and consolidated under M&C. M&C also would come to manage hotels owned by other firms across the world. As part of a restructuring exercise in 1999, CDLHI renamed to City e-Solutions Limited in 2000 with a focus on CDL's efforts to develop hospitality related internet businesses and other e-commerce business initiatives in various industries.

During the financial crisis of 2007–2008 of which Singapore was affected, its financial performance was affected by its exposure to the Sterling Pound, as the Singapore dollar had strengthened against it, via its United Kingdom-centric M&C. However, it managed to remain one of the largest real estate development firms in Singapore post recession.

In 2014, CDL appointed Grant Kelley into the newly created chief executive officer (CEO) role, capitalising on Kelley's prior international experience. The managing director role was abolished as well, and Kwek Leng Beng became a deputy chairman. Under Kelley's leadership, CDL diversified its operations away from the Singapore market, focusing on the Australian, Chinese, Japanese and British markets.  At the same time in 2015, Sherman Kwek, the elder son of Kwek Leng Beng was appointed as a deputy CEO as part of the Kwek family's succession plan in CDL management. In 2018, Sherman Kwek became the chief operating officer.

In June 2019, M&C's board agreed to recommend a takeover offer, valuing the business at £2.23 billion, from CDL for the shares it did not already own. The transaction became unconditional in September 2019. M&C was delisted from LSE on 11 October, and effectively making M&C a full subsidiary of CDL.

In May 2019, CDL made further investments into China with a 24% share acquisition of Sincere Property Group with a RMB 2.75 billion loan and a further RMB 2.75 billion tranche.  In April 2020, CDL renegotiated with Sincere to increase its shareholding in Sincere to 51.01% of its shares for a further RMB 4.39 billion due to the impact of the COVID-19 pandemic. This brought the total investments by CDL up to SGD 1.8 billion. However, new pending regulatory changes in China introduced in August 2020, to limit the amount of debt owed by real estate companies, lead to concerns on Sincere's liquidity position by CDL. At end of 2019, Sincere's liability made up of 68% of its assets, close to the 70% ceiling in the pending regulations.

On 22 October 2020, its announced that Kwek Leng Peck, a cousin of Kwek Leng Beng and a longstanding director resigned in disagreement with CDL's board on the investments into Sincere, and its management of M&C. By 30 December 2020, disagreements over the Sincere investments led to the further resignations of another two independent directors. A working group was established within CDL to directly oversee and improve on Sincere's liquidity and profitability. On 26 February 2021, CDL wrote down 93% of its investments, SGD 1.78 billion, for its 2020 fiscal year. In March 2021, Sincere missed a repayment on the principal of a bond, which it alleged that due to key matters requiring CDL's approval, causing Sincere to miss the repayment deadline. CDL refuted the claim, stating that the key decisions are jointly agreed upon and it does not have majority control of the board.

Sustainability and social efforts 
CDL formalised its sustainability efforts in 1995 with the adoption of its ethos Conversing as we Construct. In 2003, CDL established its corporate environment, health and safety policy. It then acquired ISO 14001 certification (Environmental Management System) from the local governing authority, Building and Construction Authority (BCA) in the same year. It subsequently acquired certifications in ISO 50001 – Energy Management System in 2014, and ISO 14064-1 – on quantification and reporting greenhouse gas inventory in 2016, ahead of its competitors in the property development industry.

In 1998, CDL became the first developer to install energy saving lifts, which allowed up to 50% savings of energy usage, in a residential property project, the Florida Executive Condominium. It also installed twin-chute pneumatic refuse collection system in selected condominiums, where refuse and recyclables, disposed separately at residents' doorsteps, being transported to a central collection area.

In 2009, CDL developed the 11 Tampines Concourse, Asia's first CarbonNeutral development, and City Square Mall, Singapore's first "eco-mall" with a number of eco-friendly facilities. In 2012, CDL sought to retrofit Republic Plaza, and upgraded its BCA Green Mark category from Gold to Platinum in the process. Its retrofits included an upgraded chiller plant, energy efficient lights, and motion sensors to reduce energy wastage. In 2017, CDL issued a green bond to repay a loan for the retrofitting efforts, the first such bond in Singapore.

In 2008, CDL adopted Global Reporting Initiative's reporting framework for its sustainability report, becoming the first in Singapore to do so, which eventually was given an A+ rating in 2012's edition. In the same year, CDL also had started disclosing its carbon emissions with the Carbon Disclosure Project publicly, making it the first Singaporean company to do so. CDL would eventually score itself A grades in 2019, making it one of the 170 companies listed on DCP's annual "A List". In 2019, according to Corporate Knights, CDL had the second highest score in terms of sustainability in Asia Pacific. In 2020, the company was ranked third. The reason for this was an increase in energy usage.

In addition, CDL was recognised for gender equality efforts along with DBS Bank in the Bloomberg's inaugural Gender-Equality Index (GEI) published in 2018.

Group structure 
, CDL reported having 248 subsidiaries, 53 associated companies, 12 trusts and 6 limited partnerships.

Notable subsidiaries

CBM 
Established in 1971, CBM Pte Ltd provided in-house engineering, cleaning and security services for CDL's properties. In 2007, capitalising on the capabilities in relation to facilities management gained over the years, CBM began taking on contracts from external clients across different sectors, such as Ministry of Defence and Ministry of Home Affairs. CBM also had established presence in Qatar, Thailand, and Taiwan. In 2011, CBM extended itself into developing carpark equipment for commercial and government owned carparks in Singapore, then carpark management services in Taiwan in 2014.

Millennium & Copthorne Hotels 
CDL had diversified its property investments after being controlled by Hong Leong Group, beginning with the establishment of CDL Hotels International (CDLHI) in 1989. Through CDLHI, CDL purchased hotels first within the Asian region, then further acquisitions in United States and Europe. With its acquired hotels being renamed to include the Millennium brand, CDLHI established the Millennium Hotels And Resorts global brand in 1995. Millennium & Copthorne Hotels (M&C) was subsequently listed on London Stock Exchange (LSE) in 1996 and more hotel properties and brands were acquired and consolidated under M&C. Concurrently, CDLHI became City e-Solutions Limited to focus on hospitality related internet businesses. M&C also would come to manage hotels owned by other firms across the world. In 2019, CDL privatised and made M&C a wholly owned subsidiary.

Notable partnerships 
In 2018, CDL and CapitaLand teamed up as a consortium for the Sengkang Central tender, which they eventually won with a top bid of S$777.8 million. Details of the development were released the following year with completion by 2022, being a 3.7-hectare mixed-use development next to Buangkok MRT station with a three-storey mall, a hawker centre and childcare centre, a community club which will be Singapore's largest and a 680-unit condominium. The condominium and mall have since been named the Sengkang Grand Residences and Sengkang Grand Mall.

In 2019, CDL became involved in a consortium with CapitaLand and Ascott Residence Trust to redevelop the strata titles that Liang Court shopping mall and its adjacent buildings, a hotel and a serviced apartment, are built on into an integrated development of a shopping mall, hotel, serviced apartments, and private residential towers. CDL and CapitaLand came to own Liang Court after a  purchase in the same year.

Notable projects 
CDL's portfolio spans integrated developments, shopping malls, hotels, offices and homes.
Its integrated developments include King's Centre, Sunshine Plaza, Quayside Isle @ Sentosa Cove, and South Beach Tower. Current projects in progress include the redevelopment of Liang Court, which will be completed in stages from 2024, as well as an integrated complex in Buangkok by 2022. Under its portfolio of shopping malls, it owns Katong Shopping Centre, Palais Renaissance, Tanglin Shopping Centre, Delfi Orchard, and City Square Mall. It also used to manage Lot One and Chinatown Point before being sold to CapitaLand and Perennial (Singapore) Retail Management respectively.

The majority of CDL's hotels are operated under the Millennium & Copthorne Hotels brand, which spans many countries around the world. Other hotels owned by CDL include The St. Regis Singapore, W Singapore Sentosa Cove, JW Marriott hotel in South Beach and Millennium Hilton Bangkok in Thailand. CDL's office portfolio includes City House (which was its former headquarters before moving to Republic Plaza), The Arcade, Fuji Xerox Towers, Fortune Centre, and Republic Plaza. CDL's homes portfolio include The Sail @ Marina Bay, and One Shenton Way.

Notes

References

External links 
 

 
1963 establishments in Singapore
Companies listed on the Singapore Exchange
Housing in Singapore
Multinational companies headquartered in Singapore
Real estate companies established in 1963
Real estate companies of Singapore
Singaporean brands
Singaporean companies established in 1963